The spinotectal tract (spinomesencephalic tract, spinotectal fasciculus, spino-quadrigeminal system of Mott) arises in the spinothalamic tract and terminates in the inferior and superior colliculi.

It is situated ventral to the lateral spinothalamic tract, but its fibers are more or less intermingled with it.

In the brainstem the fibers run lateral from the inferior olive, ventro-lateral from the superior olive, then ventro-medial from the spinal tract of the trigeminal; the fibers come to lie in the medial portion of the lateral lemniscus.

See also
 Tectospinal tract

References

External links
 Diagram and overview at uchicago.edu

Central nervous system pathways
Sensory systems